Ellen S. Vitetta is the director of the Cancer Immunobiology Center at the University of Texas Southwestern Medical Center in Dallas.

Background 
Vitetta earned a Bachelor of Arts degree at Connecticut College and advanced degrees at New York University Medical and Graduate Schools.

Career 
Vitetta is professor of microbiology and immunology, director of the Cancer Immunobiology Center, and holder of both the Sheryle Simmons Patigian Distinguished Chair in Cancer Immunobiology and a distinguished teaching chair at the University of Texas Southwestern Medical Center in Dallas. She has published  500 papers, edited several books, and is a co-inventor on 24 issued patents.  She is one of the top 100 most cited biomedical scientists in the world.

Vitetta is an immunologist who does translational ("bench to bedside") research. She and her colleagues first described IgD on the surface of murine B cells and she was the co-discoverer of Interleukin-4. Her group demonstrated that IL-4 was a "switch" factor for Ig on B cells. Over the past two decades, she has developed antibody-based "biological missiles" to destroy cancer cells and cells infected with HIV. These novel therapeutics have been evaluated in tissue culture, in animals and, since 1988, in over 300 humans. In 2001, Dr. Vitetta developed a vaccine against ricin, which has been  evaluated in the first clinical trial of such a vaccine.

Vitetta is a member of the National Academy of Sciences, the American Academy of Arts and Sciences, the Institute of Medicine and the American Academy of Microbiology. She was the first biomedical scientist from Texas elected to the National Academy of Sciences. She is a founding member R. Franklin Society. She served as president of the American Association of Immunogists in 1994 and received its Mentoring Award in 2002 and its Lifetime Achievement Award in 2007. In 2006, she was elected to the Texas Women's Hall of Fame. She currently serves on the board of advisors of Scientists and Engineers for America, an organization focused on promoting sound science in American government.

Vitetta's former student, Linda Buck, won the Nobel Prize in Physiology or Medicine in 2004.

Awards and honors
 2007 American Association of Immunologists Lifetime Achievement Award
 TAMEST board of directors (2007)
 Texas Women's Hall of Fame (2006)
 Institute of Medicine (2006)
 American Academy of Arts and Sciences (2003)
 Mentoring Award, American Association of Immunologists (2002)
 Charlotte Friend Award, American Association for Cancer Research (2002)
 Rosenthal Award, American Association for Cancer Research (1995)
 President, American Association of Immunologists (1994)
 National Academy of Sciences (1994)
 FASEB Excellence in Science Award (1991)
 American Academy of Microbiology

References

Connecticut College alumni
Members of the United States National Academy of Sciences
Year of birth missing (living people)
American immunologists
American women biologists
Living people
University of Texas Southwestern Medical Center faculty
American women academics
21st-century American women
Members of the National Academy of Medicine